Haemanthinae is a small subtribe of Haemantheae, and therefore within the African clades of Amaryllidoideae. It consists of two genera, Haemanthus, and Scadoxus.

Description 

The genera of Haemanthinae share brush-like inflorescences, in which the bracts frequently form part of the pollinator attraction system. Not all Scadoxus form bulbs, while all species of Haemanthus do.

Taxonomy 
For the early taxonomic history of these two genera, see Meerow and Clayton (2004). Pax (1888) treated the Amaryllidaceae as four subfamilies, with two tribes in subfamily Amarylloideae, which consisted of two tribes, Amaryllideae and Narcisseae. The former contained six subtribes, placing Haemanthus together with Clivia in subtribe Haemanthinae. Hutchinson (1934) subsequently elevated this to tribe Haemantheae. Later, Traub placed Haemanthus with Choananthus (subsequently submerged in Scadoxus) in tribe Haemantheae in his 1963 monograph on the Amaryllidaceae. Later the Müller-Doblies' created a narrower concept of Haemantheae as a tribe with Haemanthinae as one of two subtribes and two genera, Haemanthus and Scadoxus. Molecular phylogenetic research has confirmed this placement, with Meerow and Clayton (2004) situating Haemanthinae as one of three subtribes of Haemantheae.

Phylogeny 
The Haemanthinae are placed within the Haemantheae as follows:

Subdivision 
 Haemanthus  (21 species)
 Scadoxus (9–12 species)

Distribution and habitat 
Scadoxus is a forest understory herbaceous genus, most commonly found in the tropical areas of Africa. Haemanthus on the other hand is confined to southern Africa, within the summer and winter rainfall regions of the Cape.

Notes

References

Bibliography 

  Volume 1: Monocotyledonae 1926, Volume 2:Dicotyledonae 1934.
 
 
 
 
 
 
 
 , in

External links 

Amaryllidoideae
Garden plants of Southern Africa
Flora of Southern Africa
Flora of Africa
Plant subtribes